Lt.-Col. Alfred Joseph Thoburn McGaw (1 April 1900 – 8 February 1984) was an English cricketer and British Army officer.  McGaw was a right-handed batsman who bowled leg spin.  The son of John McGaw and Pauline Tate, he was born at Haslemere, Surrey, and was educated at Charterhouse School.

McGaw made his first-class debut in cricket for Sussex against Cambridge University at Fenner's in 1928.  He made a second first-class appearance in that season for Sussex, in the return fixture between the teams at the County Ground, Hove.  In June 1930, while serving in the British Raj, McGaw made a further first-class appearance for a Punjab Governor's XI against the Muslims.  The following year, back in England, McGaw made two first-class appearances for the Army against Oxford University and the Royal Air Force.  In that same season he also made a single first-class appearance for the Combined Services against the touring New Zealanders, which saw McGaw make his only first-class half century, with a score of 52.  He made a final first-class appearance for the Army in 1932, against the touring South Americans.  In his total of seven first-class matches, he scored 170 runs at an average of 17.00, while with the ball he took 8 wickets at a bowling average of 34.25, with best figures of 4/17.

He was married to Sylvia Inez Pakenham Johnstone, with the couple having one daughter, Anne, though Anne died in a car crash in 1974. He then later married a German, named Lisalotta Steiner. They conceived a son, John Joseph McGaw. McGaw lived out his final days at Saint Helier in Jersey, dying in hospital there on 8 February 1984.

References

External links
Alfred McGaw at ESPNcricinfo
Alfred McGaw at CricketArchive

1900 births
1984 deaths
People from Haslemere
People educated at Charterhouse School
Rifle Brigade officers
English cricketers
Sussex cricketers
British Army cricketers
Combined Services cricketers
20th-century British Army personnel
Military personnel from Surrey